The 2007 Super Fours was the sixth cricket Super Fours season. It took place in June and July and saw 4 teams compete in a 50 over league. A Twenty20 tournament was also scheduled, but abandoned due to rain. Rubies won the tournament, winning all of their matches to claim their second title (having previously won as Braves).

Competition format
In the one day tournament, teams played each other twice in a round-robin format, with the winners of the group winning the tournament. Matches were played using a one day format with 50 overs per side.

The group worked on a points system with positions within the divisions being based on the total points. Points were awarded as follows:

Win: 15 points. 
Tie:  6 points. 
Loss: 0 points.
Abandoned: 11 points. 
Bonus Points: Up to 5 points available to the winning team.

Teams

50 over

Results

Source: Cricket Archive

Twenty20
A Twenty20 tournament consisting of semi-finals and a Final was scheduled for 28 May, but was abandoned due to rain.

References

Super Fours